Pang Chien-kuo (19 August 1953 – 11 January 2022) was a Taiwanese politician.

Education
Pang earned a bachelor's degree in applied mathematics from National Chung Hsing University in 1975 and a master's degree in law from National Taiwan University in 1980. Pang obtained a Ph.D. in sociology from Brown University in 1988 under the guidance of Peter B. Evans. His dissertation is titled The State and Economic Transformation: The Taiwan Case.

Career
Before pursuing political office, Pang was an associate researcher within Academia Sinica's Institute of Ethnology. A member of the New Party, the People First Party, and later Kuomintang, he served in the Taipei City Council from 1992 to 2002 and in the Legislative Yuan from 2002 to 2005. He contested the 2004 legislative election as a PFP candidate, and did not win. In 2004, Pang spoke for the family of Lien Chan regarding a decision on legal action against Next Magazine.  During that year's presidential election, Pang was spokesman for the Kuomintang and People First Party's fusion ticket.

After stepping down from the legislature, Pang served as an adviser to the Straits Exchange Foundation, subsequently accepting a professorship at Chinese Culture University, within the Graduate Institute of National Development and Mainland China. Pang was later appointed director-general of the Taiwan Competitiveness Forum.

He was well known for his efforts for promoting Chinese unification.

Personal life and death
Pang was of Cantonese descent, with family origin in Yangjiang, Guangdong Province. His grandfather was a member of Sun Yat-sen's revolutionary society Tongmenghui and participated in the Yellow Flower Mound Uprising. His father was a graduate of Whampoa Military Academy and participated in the Northern Expedition and the Anti-Japanese War. Because of his family background, Pang was strongly attached to Sun Yat-sen's philosophy on building a modern China.

He married news anchor  in 2001. He died from a fall from his home in Neihu District on 11 January 2022 at 7am, at the age of 68. A few hours before his death, Pang left a message three times in his LINE group and the same message in his WeChat groups, saying "I would rather die than live in this unjust Taiwan!" Worried about the hardships of the people and the future of Taiwan, he had been deeply saddened by the huge defeats of the KMT in the referendum a month earlier and in the recall election of Freddy Lim and legislator by-election two days earlier, and had been distraught by the on-going de-Sinicization pushed forward by the ruling DPP. Prior to his death, Pang had been diagnosed with cancer.

References

1953 births
2022 deaths
20th-century Taiwanese politicians
New Party (Taiwan) politicians
People First Party Members of the Legislative Yuan
Kuomintang politicians in Taiwan
Members of the 5th Legislative Yuan
Taipei City Councilors
Politicians of the Republic of China on Taiwan from Miaoli County
National Chung Hsing University alumni
National Taiwan University alumni
Brown University alumni
Deaths from falls
Academic staff of the Chinese Culture University
People of Cantonese descent